Bekhayali is a Hindi song from the 2019 romantic film Kabir Singh, sung by Arijit Singh and Sachet Tandon composed by Sachet–Parampara and penned by Irshad Kamil.

Background 
Liking Sachet–Parampara's work in Batti Gul Meter Chalu, Shahid Kapoor arranged for the duo's meeting with director Sandeep Reddy Vanga and the producers of Kabir Singh. "We were told to create a song that would be main song of the story with five emotions, because it had to capture the whole story. Vanga already had a song in his mind for the film. The new song had to be that good, which could overpower the earlier one, and he should feel it was also going with the narrative", says Sachet.

Personnel 
The song "Bekhayali" has been sung by Sachet Tandon and the music is composed by Sachet–Parampara and lyrics are written by Irshad Kamil. The music producers are Kalyan Baruah and Sachet–Parampara with acoustic guitar by Rhythm Shaw and electric guitars by Kalyan Baruah. The song was recorded at Forest Studios and mixed & mastered by Aftab Khan at HeadRoom Studios. Vatsal Chevli assisted in mixing. The second version of the song is sung by Arijit Singh.

Music video 
The music video was released on 19 June 2019 by T-Series on YouTube. It has been viewed more than 149 million times since the day of its release on YouTube. The second version of the song sung by Arijit Singh has been viewed more than 34 million times on YouTube.

Reception 
Sachet's Version was a chartbuster even before its release, with several cover versions available on YouTube. Suryakant Singh of Mumbai Press praising music and lyrics finds the song high on emotions with fans relating with it.

References

External links 

T-Series (company) singles
Indian songs
2019 songs
Hindi film songs
Arijit Singh songs